Maryland Million Nursery Stakes is an American Thoroughbred horse race held annually in October since 1986 primarily at Laurel Park Racecourse in Laurel, Maryland or at Pimlico Race Course in Baltimore. To be eligible for the Maryland Million Nursery, a horse must be sired by a stallion who stands in Maryland. Due to that, the race is classified as a Restricted stakes race and is not eligible for grading by the American Graded Stakes Committee.

The race is part of Maryland Million Day, a 12-race program held in mid October that was the creation of renowned television sports journalist Jim McKay. The "Maryland Million" is the first State-Bred showcase event ever created. Since 1986, 27 other events in 20 states have imitated the showcase and its structure.

At its inception in 1986 the race was run at one mile. In 1987 and 1989 through 1992, 2001, 2002, and 2004 the race was run at 6 furlongs. In addition to the prize money, the winning owner receives a Maryland Million Waterford Crystal bowl.

In its 30th running in 2015, the race was restricted to those horses who were sired by a stallion who stands in the state of Maryland. Both the entrant horse and their stallion had to be nominated to the Maryland Million program.

Records 

Speed record: 
 6 furlongs : 1:09.22 - Tobaggan Slide (2009)
 7 furlongs : 1:23.17 - Polish Rifle (2003)

Most wins by an owner:
 2 - Eugene Ford  (1996, 2005)

Most wins by a jockey:
 3 - Ryan Fogelsonger   (2002, 2004, 2007)

Most wins by a trainer:
 2 - H. Graham Motion  (1996, 2005)

Winners

See also 
 Maryland Million Nursery top three finishers
 Maryland Million Day
 Laurel Park Racecourse

References

 Maryland Thoroughbred official website

Horse races in Maryland
Recurring events established in 1986
Laurel Park Racecourse
Recurring sporting events established in 1986
1986 establishments in Maryland